Turkish cuisine is the cuisine of Turkey and the Turkish diaspora. It is largely the heritage of Ottoman cuisine, which can be described as a fusion and refinement of Mediterranean, Balkan, Middle Eastern, Central Asian and Eastern European cuisines. Turkish cuisine has in turn influenced those and other neighbouring cuisines, including those of Southeast Europe (Balkans), Central Europe, and Western Europe. The Ottomans fused various culinary traditions of their realm taking influences from and influencing Mesopotamian cuisine, Greek cuisine, Levantine cuisine, Egyptian cuisine, Balkan cuisine, along with traditional Turkic elements from Central Asia (such as mantı, ayran, kaymak), creating a vast array of specialities. Turkish cuisine also includes dishes invented in the Ottoman palace kitchen.

Turkish cuisine varies across the country. The cooking of Istanbul, Bursa, Izmir, and rest of the Anatolia region inherits many elements of Ottoman court cuisine, including moderate use of spices, a preference for rice over bulgur, koftes, and a wider availability of vegetable stews (türlü), eggplant, stuffed dolmas and fish. The cuisine of the Black Sea Region uses fish extensively, especially the Black Sea anchovy (hamsi) and includes maize dishes. The cuisine of the southeast (e.g. Urfa, Gaziantep, Adıyaman and Adana) is famous for its variety of kebabs, mezes and dough-based desserts such as baklava, şöbiyet, kadayıf, katmer and  künefe.

Especially in the western parts of Turkey, where olive trees grow abundantly, olive oil is the major type of oil used for cooking. The cuisines of the Aegean, Marmara and Mediterranean regions are rich in vegetables, herbs, and fish. Central Anatolia has many famous specialties, such as keşkek, mantı (especially from Kayseri) and gözleme. Food names directly cognate with mantı are also found in Chinese (mantou or steamed bun) and Korean cuisine (mandu) and it is generally considered to have originated in Mongolia during the 13th century.

Specialties are often named for places, and may refer to different styles of preparation. For example, Urfa kebap is less spicy and thicker than Adana kebap. Although meat-based foods such as kebabs are common in Turkish cuisine abroad, meals in Turkey largely center around rice, vegetables, and bread.

Culinary customs

Breakfast 

A traditional Turkish breakfast is rich in variety. A typical serving consists of cheese (beyaz peynir, kaşar, etc.), butter, olives, eggs, muhammara, tomatoes, cucumbers, jam, honey, and kaymak, sucuk (a spicy Turkish meat similar to sausages), pastırma, börek, simit, poğaça, açma, fried dough (known as pişi), as well as soups are eaten as a morning meal in Turkey. A specialty for breakfast is called menemen, which is prepared with tomatoes, green peppers, onion, olive oil and eggs. The breakfast menu can also include kuymak (depending on the province the dish is also known as muhlama, mıhlama and yağlaş). Another specialty is the Balkan Turkish dish çılbır, also known as Turkish eggs, made with poached eggs and yogurt. Invariably, Turkish tea is served at breakfast. The Turkish word for breakfast, kahvaltı, means "before coffee".

Homemade food 
Homemade food is still preferred by Turkish people. Although the newly introduced way of life pushes the new generation to eat out; Turkish people generally prefer to eat at home. A typical meal starts with soup (especially in wintertime), followed by a dish made of vegetables (olive oil or with grounded meat), meat or legumes boiled in a pot (typically with meat or minced meat), often with or before Turkish pilav, pasta or bulgur pilav accompanied by a salad or cacık (diluted cold yogurt dish with garlic, salt, and cucumber slices). In summertime many people prefer to eat a cold dish of vegetables cooked with olive oil (zeytinyağlı yemekler) instead of the soup, either before or after the main course, which can also be a chicken, meat or fish plate.

Restaurants 

Although fast food is gaining popularity and many major foreign fast food chains have opened all over Turkey, Turkish people still rely primarily on the rich and extensive dishes of Turkish cuisine. In addition, some traditional Turkish foods, especially köfte, döner, kokoreç, kumpir, midye tava, börek and gözleme, are often served as fast food in Turkey. Eating out has always been common in large commercial cities. Esnaf lokantası (meaning restaurants for shopkeepers and tradesmen) are widespread, serving traditional Turkish home cooking at affordable prices.

Summer cuisine 
In the hot Turkish summer, a meal often consists of fried vegetables such as eggplant (aubergine) and peppers or potatoes served with yogurt or tomato sauce. Menemen and çılbır are typical summer dishes, based on eggs. Sheep cheese, cucumbers, tomatoes, watermelons and melons also make a light summer meal. Those who like helva for dessert prefer "summer helva", which is lighter and less sweet than the regular version.

Key ingredients 

Frequently used ingredients in Turkish specialties include lamb, chicken, beef, fish, rice, eggplants, green peppers, onions, garlic, lentils, beans, zucchinis, chickpeas and tomatoes. Nuts, especially pistachios, chestnuts, almonds, hazelnuts, and walnuts, together with spices, have a special place in Turkish cuisine, and are used extensively in desserts or eaten separately. Semolina flour is used to make a cake called revani and irmik helvasi.

Olives are also common on various breakfasts and meze tables frequently. Beyaz peynir and yoğurt are part of many dishes including börek, manti, kebab and cacık.

Oils and fats 

Butter or margarine, olive oil, sunflower oil, canola oil, and corn oil are widely used for cooking. Sesame, hazelnut, peanut and walnut oils are used as well. Kuyruk yağı (tail fat of sheep) is sometimes used in kebabs and meat dishes.

Fruit 
The rich and diverse flora of Turkey means that fruit is varied, abundant and cheap. In Ottoman Cuisine, fruit frequently accompanied meat as a side dish. Plums, apricots, pomegranates, pears, apples, grapes,  figs and quinces along with many kinds of citrus are the most frequently used fruit, either fresh or dried, in Turkish cuisine. For example, komposto (compote) or hoşaf (from Persian khosh âb, literally meaning "nice water") are among the main side dishes to meat or pilav. Dolma and Pilav usually contain currants or raisins. Etli Yaprak Sarma (vine leaves stuffed with meat and rice) used to be cooked with sour plums in Ottoman cuisine. Turkish desserts do not normally contain fresh fruit, but may contain dried varieties.

Eggplant has a special place in the Turkish cuisine.

Meats 

In some regions, meat, which was mostly eaten only at wedding ceremonies or during the Kurban Bayramı (Eid ul-Adha) as etli pilav (pilav with meat), has become part of the daily diet since the introduction of industrial production. Veal, formerly shunned, is now widely consumed.

The main use of meat in cooking remains the combination of ground meat and vegetable, with names such as kıymalı fasulye (beans with ground meat) or kıymalı ıspanak (spinach with ground meat, which is sometimes served with yoğurt).

Alternatively, in coastal towns cheap fish such as sardalya (sardines) or hamsi (anchovies) are widely available, as well as many others with seasonal availability. Poultry consumption, almost exclusively of chicken and eggs, is common. Milk-fed lambs, once the most popular source of meat in Turkey, comprise a small part of contemporary consumption. Kuzu çevirme, cooking milk-fed lamb on a spit, once an important ceremony, is rarely seen.

Dishes and foods

Dairy products 

Yoğurt is an important element in Turkish cuisine. In fact, the English word yogurt or yoghurt derives from the Turkish word yoğurt. Yoğurt can accompany almost all meat dishes (kebabs, köfte), vegetable dishes (especially fried eggplant, courgette, spinach with minced meat etc.), meze and a specialty called mantı (folded triangles of dough containing minced meat). In villages, yoğurt is regularly eaten with pilav or bread. A thicker, higher-fat variety, süzme yoğurt or "strained yogurt", is made by straining the yoğurt curds from the whey. One of the most common Turkish drinks, ayran, is made from yoğurt. Also, yoğurt is often used in the preparation of cakes, some soups and pastries. Kashk is a fermented and strained sour yogurt that can be consumed on its own as a cheese, or used as an ingredient in soups.

Cheeses 

Turkey produces many varieties of cheese, mostly from sheep's milk. In general, these cheeses are not long matured, with a comparatively low fat content. The production of many kinds of cheese is local to particular regions. There are 193 different cheeses in Turkey, but only 8 of these cheeses have geographical indication.

 Beyaz peynir is a salty brined cheese taking its name from its white color ("white cheese"). It is similar to feta but not as strong. This is produced in styles ranging from unmatured cheese curds to a quite strong mature version. It has many varieties due to source of milk, region (Ezine or Thrace) and production methods (classic or cultured). It is eaten plain (e.g. as part of the traditional Turkish breakfast), used in salads, and incorporated into cooked foods such as menemen, börek and pide.
 Çerkez peyniri, means "Circassian cheese". It has two variations, smoked or non-smoked.
 Çökelek is dried cottage cheese. There are many regional varieties of çökelek. Some are eaten fresh while others are preserved, either by storage in goatskin bags or pottery jars, or by drying in the sun. 
 Çömlek cheese is a typical artisanal cheese from Central Anatolia.
 Kurut and keş are regional names for dried bricks of yogurt made from low-fat milk or from çökelek made from buttermilk.
 Golot cheese is one of the most important traditional cheeses produced in the region of East Black Sea.
 Gravyer is produced in Turkey as well. Among others, Kars is famous for this type of cheese.
 Hellim is a salty, firm-textured goat cheese, generally with some mint added, made in Cyprus. In Turkey, it is common to fry hellim in a pan in some olive oil.
 Kaşar is Turkey's other ubiquitous cheese, a moderately fatty sheep's cheese similar to the Greek kasseri, sometimes marketed as "Turkish cheddar", being closer in consistency and taste to mild cheddar-style cheese than other Turkish cheeses. Less matured kaşar, called fresh kaşar, is widely consumed as well. Two varieties are popular Kars and Thrace.
 Kaşkaval is a wheel-shaped yellow sheep's cheese, similar to fresh kaşar. The name comes from Romanian word cașcaval, which bears the Italian structure of caciocavallo. 
 Lor is the other type of unsalted whey cheese, similarly made from the whey left over from kaşar or strained yogurt manufacture. Lor is used in traditional foods and desserts made from unsalted cheese like "ekşimik" and höşmerim
 Mihaliç peyniri or Kelle peyniri is a hard sheep's cheese that can be grated, like Parmesan cheese. Sometimes goat or cow milk is used. It is a specialty from Karacabey, a town in Bursa province which was called Mihaliç during Byzantine and Ottoman period. Mostly it is produced from non-pasteurized milk and processed by salt.
 Örgü peyniri, "braided cheese", is a specialty from Diyarbakır.
 Otlu peynir, Van herbed cheese ("herbed cheese") is produced in many areas, chiefly in East Anatolia. Traditionally sheep's or goat's milk is used, but more recently cow's milk otlu peynir has been produced. The type of herb used varies by region: in Van wild garlic is traditional; Bitlis otlu peynir contains a damp-loving herb known as sof otu. In other areas horse mint (Mentha longifolia) and Pimpinella rhodentha are used.
 Tulum is a mostly sheep's curd molded in an animal skin bag called as tulum. There are regional varieties of tulum peynir in such areas as İzmir, Ödemiş and Erzincan. And each of the tulum cheeses have very different characteristics.

Soups 
A Turkish meal usually starts with a thin soup (çorba). Soups are usually named after their main ingredient, the most common types being mercimek (lentil) çorbası, yogurt, and wheat (often mashed) called tarhana çorbası. Delicacy soups are the ones that are usually not the part of the daily diet, such as İşkembe soup and paça çorbası, although the latter also used to be consumed as a nutritious winter meal. Before the popularisation of the typical Turkish breakfast, soup was the default morning meal for some people.
The most common soups in Turkish cuisine are:

 Analı kızlı soup
 Yayla çorbası 
 Erişte aşı
 Buğday aşı/Ayran çorbası (which is served cold)
 Corba
 Domates çorbası (tomato soup)
 Düğün çorbası (wedding soup)
 Ekşi Aşı
 Ezogelin çorbası
 İşkembe çorbası 
 Keledoş
 Lahana çorbası (cabbage soup)
 Mahluta
 Mercimek çorbası (lentil soup)
 Paça
 Pazı
 Şehriye
 Sheep's sorrel soup
 Sulu köfte
 Sumak aşı
 Tarhana çorbası
 Tavuk (chicken soup; with almond it becomes bademli tavuk)
 Toyga soup
 Trabzon Balık çorbası
 Tutmaç (lentil dish with noodles)
 Yüksük çorbası
 Arabaşı çorbası

Bread 
 Bazlama
 Gözleme
 Mısır ekmeği (corn bread)
 Lavaş
 Poğaça
 Pide (a broad, round and flat bread made of wheat flour)
 Simit (known as "gevrek" in Izmir, another type of ring-shaped bread covered with sesame seeds. Simit is commonly eaten in Turkey, plain or with cheese, butter or marmalade).
 Açma
 Yufka, also known as sac ekmeği a round and flat bread, made of wheat flour, thinner than pide.
 Pişi

Pastries 

Turkish cuisine has a range of savoury and sweet pastries. Dough-based specialties form an integral part of traditional Turkish cuisine.

The use of layered dough is rooted in the nomadic character of early Central Asian Turks. The combination of domed metal sac and oklava (the Turkish rod-style rolling pin) enabled the invention of the layered dough style used in börek (especially in Su Böreği, or 'water pastry', a salty baklava-like pastry with cheese filling), güllaç and baklava.

Börek is the general name for salty pastries made with yufka (a thick phyllo dough), which consists of thin layers of dough. Su Böreği, made with boiled yufka/phyllo layers, cheese and parsley, is the most frequently eaten. Çiğ börek (also known as Tatar böreği) is fried and stuffed with minced meat. Kol böreği is another well-known type of börek that takes its name from its shape, as do fincan (coffee cup), muska (talisman), Gül böreği (rose) or Sigara böreği (cigarette). Other traditional Turkish böreks include Talaş böreği (phyllo dough filled with vegetables and diced meat), Puf böreği. Laz böreği is a sweet type of börek, widespread in the Black Sea region.

Poğaça is the label name for dough based salty pastries. Likewise çörek is another label name used for both sweet and salty pastries.

Gözleme is a food typical in rural areas, made of lavash bread or phyllo dough folded around a variety of fillings such as spinach, cheese and parsley, minced meat or potatoes and cooked on a large griddle (traditionally sac).

Katmer is another traditional rolled-out dough. It can be salty or sweet according to the filling. Katmer with pistachio and kaymak is a sweet food and one of the most popular breakfast items in Gaziantep.

Lahmacun (meaning dough with meat in Arabic) is a thin flatbread covered with a layer of spiced minced meat, tomato, pepper, onion or garlic.

Pide, which can be made with minced meat (together with onion, chopped tomatoes, parsley and spices), kashar cheese, spinach, white cheese, pieces of meat, braised meat (kavurma), sucuk, pastırma or/and eggs put on rolled-out dough, is one of the most common traditional stone-baked Turkish specialities.

Açma is a soft bagel found in most parts of Turkey. It is similar to simit in shape, is covered in a glaze, and is usually eaten as a part of breakfast or as a snack.

Pilav and pasta

Vegetarian dishes

Vegetable dishes 

A vegetable dish can be a main course in a Turkish meal. A large variety of vegetables are used, such as spinach, leek, cauliflower, artichoke, cabbage, celery, eggplant, green and red bell peppers, string bean and sunchokes. A typical vegetable dish is prepared with a base of chopped onions, carrots sautéed first in olive oil and later with tomatoes or tomato paste. The vegetables and hot water will then be added. Quite frequently a spoon of rice and lemon juice is also added. Vegetable dishes usually tend to be served with its own water (the cooking water) thus often called in colloquial Turkish sulu yemek (literally "a dish with juice"). Minced meat can also be added to a vegetable dish but vegetable dishes that are cooked with olive oil (zeytinyağlılar) are often served cold and do not contain meat. Spinach, leek, string bean and artichoke with olive oil are among the most widespread dishes in Turkey.

Dolma is the name used for stuffed vegetables. Like the vegetables cooked with olive oil as described above dolma with olive oil does not contain meat. Many vegetables are stuffed, most typically green peppers (biber dolması), eggplants, tomatoes, or zucchini/courgettes (kabak dolması), vine leaves (yaprak dolması). If vine leaves are used, they are first pickled in brine. However, dolma is not limited to these common types; many other vegetables and fruits are stuffed with a meat or pilav mixture. For example, artichoke dolma (enginar dolması) is an Aegean region specialty. Fillings used in dolma may consist of parts of the vegetable carved out for preparation, pilav with spices or minced meat.

Mercimek köftesi, although being named köfte, does not contain any meat. Instead, red lentil is used as the major ingredient together with spring onion, tomato paste etc.

İmam bayıldı is a version of karnıyarık with no minced meat inside. It can be served as a meze as well.

Fried eggplant and pepper is a common summer dish in Turkey. It is served with yoğurt or tomato sauce and garlic.

Mücver is prepared with grated squash/courgette or potatoes, egg, onion, dill or cheese and flour. It can be either fried or cooked in the oven.

Pilav can be served either as a side dish or main dish but bulgur pilavı (pilav made of boiled and pounded wheat - bulgur) is also widely eaten. The dishes made with kuru fasulye (white beans), nohut (chickpeas), mercimek (lentils), börülce (black-eyed peas), etc., combined with onion, vegetables, minced meat, tomato paste and rice, have always been common due to being economical and nutritious.

Turşu is pickle made with brine, usually with the addition of garlic. It is often enjoyed as an appetizer. It is made with a large variety of vegetables, from cucumber to courgette. In the towns on the Aegean coast, the water of turşu is consumed as a drink. It comes from the Persian "Torshi", which refers to pickled "Torsh" (sour) vegetables.

Egg dishes 

 Menemen consists of scrambled eggs cooked in tomato, green pepper, and optionally onion and garlic.
 Çılbır is made with poached eggs, yogurt and oil.
 Ispanaklı yumurta consists of eggs with spinach and onion.
 Kaygana can be described as something of a cross between the crepe and the omelet in Ottoman cuisine. It used to be served with cheese, honey, crushed nuts, or eggplant.

Meze and salads 

Meze is a selection of food served as the appetizer course with or without drinks. Some of them can be served as a main course as well.

Aside from olive, mature kaşar kashar cheese, white cheese, various mixed pickles turşu, frequently eaten Turkish mezes include:
 Acılı ezme – hot spicy freshly mashed tomato with onion and green herbs
 Acuka (also known as muhammara) – a spread having both Circassian and Syrian origins, prepared with from Aleppo pepper paste, ground walnuts, tomato paste, bread crumbs, garlic, and spices
 Arnavut ciğeri (literally "Albanian liver") – fried liver cubes served with onion, parsley and hot pepper
 Roka (arugula) salatası
 Patlıcan salatası – eggplant salad
 Piyaz – white bean or potato salad with onion and vinegar
 Şakşuka or in another version köpoğlu – fried and chopped eggplants and peppers served with garlic yogurt or tomato sauce
 Bakla ezmesi – hummus prepared from broad bean
 Barbunya pilaki – borlotti beans cooked with garlic, tomato paste, carrot and olive oil
 Borani
 Börek – very thin dough layers stuffed with cheese, meat or vegetables
 Cacık – cucumber with yogurt, dried mint and olive oil
 Cevizli biber – a meze prepared with walnut, red pepper, pepper paste, onion and cumin
 Çerkez tavuğu (literally "Circassian chicken")
 Ahtapot (octopus) – in seatowns served as a salad or grilled
 Çiğ köfte – raw meat patties, similar to steak tartare, prepared with ground beef (sometimes lamb) and fine-ground bulgur; a vegetarian version using tomato paste is known as etsiz çiğ köfte (literally "meatless raw meatballs")
 Çoban salatası – a mixed salad of tomato, cucumber, onion, green peppers, and parsley
 Deniz börülcesi salatası, a salad made with young shoots of Salicornia europaea (also called common glasswort or marsh samphire), garlic, lemon juice and olive oil
 Dolma – vine leaves, cabbage leaves, chard leaves, peppers, tomato, squash, pumpkin, eggplant or mussels stuffed with rice or meat
 Fasulye pilaki – white beans cooked with garlic, tomato paste, carrot and olive oil
 Ezme - red pepper, onion, garlic, parsley leaves with tomato paste. The salad is seasoned with lemon, olive oil, cumin, salt and pepper.
 Fava – broad/horse bean puree
 Gavurdağı salatası
 Hardalotu – mustard plant salad
 Haydari
 Humus (from the Arabic for "chickpea") – a spread prepared from sesame tahini, chickpeas, garlic, olive oil, and lemon juice.
 İçli köfte (also known as oruk) – served either as a meze or a main dish; especially in the east of Turkey, when it is cooked through boiling in a pot, içli köfte is served as a main dish
 Kabak çiçeği dolması – stuffed zucchini blossoms, a kind of dolma
 Kalamar (calamari) – fried or grilled, served with tarator sauce
 Karides (shrimp) – served as a salad, grilled, or stewed with vegetables in a güveç (a casserole)
 Kısır (also known as 'sarma içi') – a very popular meze or side dish prepared with fine-ground bulgur, tomato paste, parsley, onion, garlic, sour pomegranate juice and a lot of spices
 Kızartma, various fried vegetables (eggplants, peppers, courgettes) served with yogurt or tomato-and-garlic sauce
 Köfte – meatballs
 Lakerda - picked bonito traditionally served with raki at taverns
 Muhammara: see Acuka
 Oruk: see İçli köfte
 Semizotu (summer purslane) salatası – served with yogurt
 Sıgara boreğı - feta or hot dogs wrapped in phyllo dough and fried
 Soslu patlıcan - cubed eggplant served in a sauce of olive oil and tomato
 Tarama – a spread made with fish roe
 Turp otu salatası
 Zeytin piyazi - olives and green onion salad

Dolma and sarma 

Dolma is a verbal noun of the Turkish verb dolmak 'to be stuffed (or filled)', and means simply 'stuffed thing'. Sarma is also a verbal noun of the Turkish verb sarmak 'to wrap', and means simply 'wrapped/wrapping'. Dolma and sarma have a special place in Turkish cuisine. They can be eaten either as a meze or a main dish. They can be cooked either as a vegetable dish or meat dish. If a meat mixture is put in, they are usually served hot with yogurt and spices such as oregano and red pepper powder with oil. If the mixture is vegan, only olive oil, rice or bulgur are used, with some nuts and raisins inside, especially blackcurrant.

 (stuffed leaves with olive oil) is the sarma made with vine leaves stuffed with a rice-spice mixture and cooked with olive oil. This type of dolma does not contain meat, is served cold and also referred to as sarma, which means "wrapping" in Turkish. Dried fruit such as blackcurrant, raisins, figs or cherries, and cinnamon and allspice used to be added into the mixture to sweeten zeytinyağlı dolma in Ottoman cuisine. Vine leaves (yaprak) could be filled not only with rice and spices but also with meat and rice, etli yaprak sarma, in which case it was often served hot with yogurt. The word sarma is also used for some types of desserts, such as fıstık sarma (wrapped pistachio).

Melon dolma along with quince or apple dolma was one of the palace's specialties (raw melon stuffed with minced meat, onion, rice, almonds, cooked in an oven). In contemporary Turkey, a wide variety of dolma is prepared. Although it is not possible to give an exhaustive list of dolma recipes, courgette ("kabak"), aubergine ("patlıcan"), tomato ("domates"), pumpkin ("balkabağı"), pepper ("biber"), cabbage ("lahana") (black or white cabbage), chard ("pazı") and mussel ("midye") dolma constitute the most common types. Instead of dried cherries in the Palace Cuisine, currants are usually added to the filling of dolma cooked in olive oil. A different type of dolma is mumbar dolması, for which the membrane of intestines of sheep is filled up with a spicy rice pilav-nut mixture.

Meat dishes 

 
 Consisted of chicken or lean veal, Döner kebap is a common Turkish fast food.
 Tantuni (similar to dürüm, meat cut in very small pieces, served with lavash, a specialty from the Mersin province of Turkey)
 Kuzu güveç (lamb cooked in earthenware casserole)
 Pastırmalı kuru fasulye (white kidney bean stew with pastırma)
 Kuzu kapama (spring lamb stewed)
 Haşlama (boiled lamb with vegetables and lemon juice)
 Kavurma which means frying, roasting or parching in Turkish, is generally used for roasted lamb or a variety of fried meat dishes. Çoban kavurma is a variety of it, prepared with diced lamb with tomatoes, onions, mushrooms, peppers and herbs. Kavurma is one of the favorite dishes of Ramadan.
 Alinazik, a home-style Turkish kebab variety which is a specialty of the Gaziantep province.
 Hünkârbeğendi (the name means that the sovereign/sultan liked it, the dish consists of a puree of grilled eggplant with kaşar cheese, topped with cubed lamb meat)
 Türlü (a stew of vegetables and meat cooked in güveç-casserole)
 Külbastı 
 Ankara tava (pilav with lamb)
 Elbasan tava
 Tandır (without adding any water, the meat is cooked very slowly with a special technique)
 İncik (lamb shank cooked in the oven)
 Boraniye (broad bean/spinach/squash boraniye, vegetables cooked together with meat, yogurt and chickpea)
 Karnıyarık (split-belly eggplant) (eggplants are cut off and fried. Then they are filled with minced meat, onion, garlic and tomato paste and cooked in the oven.
 Kanat (chicken wings)
 Köfte (meatball) is another meat dish in Turkey. The word köfte is sometimes preceded by the name of a town, which refers to the technique for cooking it or the ingredients or spices specifically used in that region, for example; İnegöl köftesi, İzmir köfte, Akçaabat köfte, pideli köfte (Bursa), Filibe köfte, Tire köfte, Islama köfte (mainly in Sakarya province) etc. Its main ingredients are minced meat, parsley, bread-egg (not necessarily, usually homemade köfte contains egg yolk and some crumbled bread) and a range of spices: cumin, oregano, mint powder, red or black pepper powder with onion or garlic. Kadınbudu köfte is another traditional speciality; minced meat is mixed with cooked rice and fried. Içli köfte can be described as a shell of "bulgur" filled with onion, minced meat and nuts. Çiğ köfte is a meze from south-eastern Turkey meaning raw meatballs, prepared with bulgur wheat and raw minced meat (like beef or lamb). Today in most Turkish restaurants, the raw meat is usually omitted and instead extra-fine Bulgar is used. Terbiyeli Sulu Köfte is another meatball speciality cooked with flour, tomato paste and water in which lemon and egg sauce is added.
 Sucuk is a form of raw sausage (made with beef meat and a range of spices, and garlic) commonly eaten with breakfast. Instead of classical sausages (sosis), sucuk is the most used ingredient for snacks and fast-food style toasts and sandwiches in Turkey.
 Pastırma is another famous beef delicacy. Both pastırma and sucuk can be put in kuru fasulye (dry beans) to enrich the aroma. Both can be served as a meze as well. Sucuk or pastırma with scrambled eggs, served in a small pan called sahan, is eaten at breakfast in Turkey.
 Kokoreç (the intestines of sheep) with spices is a traditional low-price fast food in Turkey.
 Liver is fried in Turkish cuisine. "Arnavut ciğeri" (meaning Albanian liver), served with onion and sumac, is usually eaten as a meze, in combination with other mezes such as fava. "Edirne ciğeri" is another famous liver dish from Edirne. Liver is first frozen so that it can be cut into very thin layers. After being cut off, liver layers are fried.
 Kelle (roasted sheep's head)
 Kuzu etli enginar (artichokes with lamb)
 Etli taze fasulye (green beans stew with meat)
 Etli bamya (okra with meat)
 İşkembeli nohut (chickpea with tripe)
 Piliç dolma (stuffed chicken with spice filling)

Kebabs 

Kebab refers to a great variety of meat-based dishes in Turkish cuisine. Kebab in Turkey encompasses not only grilled or skewered meats, but also stews and casseroles.

 Adana kebap or kıyma kebabı – kebab with hand-minced meat mixed with chili on a flat wide metal skewer (shish); associated with Adana region although very popular all over Turkey.
 Ali Paşa kebabı, "Ali Pasha kebab" – cubed lamb with tomato, onion and parsley wrapped in phillo.
 Alinazik kebab – Ground meat kebab sautéed in a saucepan, with garlic, yogurt and eggplants added.
 Bahçıvan kebabı, 'gardener's kebab' – Boneless lamb shoulder mixed with chopped onions and tomato paste.
 Beyti kebab – Ground lamb or beef, seasoned and grilled on a skewer, often served wrapped in lavash and topped with tomato sauce and yogurt, traced back to the famous kebab house Beyti in Istanbul and particularly popular in Turkey's larger cities.
 Bostan kebabı – Lamb and aubergine casserole.
 Buğu kebabı, "steamed kebap" – cooked in low heat until the meat releases its moisture and reabsorbs it.
 Cağ kebab, 'spoke kebab' – Cubes of lamb roasted first on a cağ (a horizontal rotating spit) and then on a skewer, a specialty of Erzurum region with recently rising popularity.
 Ciğer kebabı, 'liver kebab' - usually eaten with sliced onions, salad and bread.
 Ciğerli kağıt kebabı, 'liver paper kebab' – Lamb liver kebab mixed with meat and marinated with thyme, parsley and dill.
 Çardak kebabı, 'arbor kebab' – Stuffed lamb meat in a crêpe.
 Çökertme kebabı – Sirloin veal kebap stuffed with yogurt and potatoes.
 Çömlek kebabı, 'earthenware bowl kebab' – Meat and vegetable casserole (called a güveç in Turkish) with eggplant, carrots, shallots, beans, tomatoes and green pepper.
 Çöp şiş, "small skewer kebab" – a speciality of Selçuk and Germencik near Ephesus, pounded boneless meat with tomatoes and garlic marinated with black pepper, thyme and oil on wooden skewers.
 Döner kebab
 Hünkâri kebabı, 'Sultan's kebab' – Sliced lamb meat mixed with patlıcan beğendi (aubergine purée), basil, thyme and bay leaf.
 İskender kebap – döner kebap served with yogurt, tomato sauce and butter, originated in Bursa. The kebab was invented by İskender Efendi in 1867. He was inspired from Cağ kebab and turned it from horizontal to vertical.
 İslim kebabı, 'steamed kebab' – Another version of the aubergine kebab without its skin, marinated in sunflower oil.
 Kağıt kebabı – Lamb cooked in a paper wrapping.
 Kuyu kebabı, 'pit kebab' – Prepared from the goat it is special for Aydın region, similar to tandır kebabı.
 Kuzu incik kebabı, 'lamb shank kebab' – Lamb shanks mixed with peeled eggplants and chopped tomatoes, cream, salt and pepper.
 Kuzu şiş – Shish prepared with marinated milk-fed lamb meat.
 Köfte kebap or Shish köfte – minced lamb meatballs with herbs, often including parsley and mint, on a stick, grilled.
 Manisa kebabı – This Manisa region version of the kebab is smaller and flat size shish meat on the sliced pide bread, flavored with butter, and stuffed with tomato, garlic and green pepper.
 Orman kebabı, 'forest kebab' – Lamb meat on the bone and cut in large pieces mixed with carrots, potatoes and peas.
 Patates kebabı, 'potato kebab' – Beef or chicken mixed with potatoes, onions, tomato sauce and bay leaves.
 Patlıcan kebabı, 'aubergine kebab' – Special kebap meat marinated in spices and served with eggplant (aubergine), hot pide bread and a yogurt sauce.
 Ramazan kebabı, 'Ramadan kebab' – Meat mixed with yogurt, tomato and garlic stuffed with fresh mint or garnish on Pide bread.
 Shish kebab – Prepared with fish, lamb or chicken meat on thin metal or reed rods, grilled.
 Şiş tavuk or Tavuk şiş – Yogurt-marinated chicken grilled on a stick.
 Sivas kebabı – Associated with the Sivas region, similar to Tokat kebab but especially lamb ribs are preferred and it also differs from Tokat kebabı on the point that there are no potatoes inside.
 Susuz kebap, 'waterless kebab' – Cooked after draining excess fluid from the meat rubbed with salt and cinnamon in saucepan.
 Talaş kebabı, 'sawdust kebab' – Diced lamb, mixed with grated onions, brown meat mixed with flour dough.
 Tandır kebabı, 'tandoor kebab' – Lamb pieces (sometimes a whole lamb) baked in an oven called a tandır, which requires a special way of cooking for hours. Served with bread and raw onions.
 Tas kebabı, 'bowl kebab' – Stewed kebab in a bowl, beginning with the cooking of the vegetables in butter employing a method called yaga vurmak, ("butter infusion"), before the meat itself is cooked in the same grease.
 Testi kebabı, 'earthenware-jug kebab' – Ingredients are similar to çömlek kebabı, prepared in a testi instead of a güveç, generally found in Central Anatolia and the Mid-Western Black Sea region.
 Tokat kebabı – Associated with the Tokat region, it is made with veal marinated in olive oil, aubergine, tomatoes, potatoes, onion, garlic and special pita bread.
 Urfa kebabı – is similar to Adana kebabı, but less spicy.

Fish 
Turkey is surrounded by seas that contain a large variety of fish. Fish are grilled, fried or cooked slowly by the buğulama (poaching) method. Buğulama is fish with lemon and parsley, covered while cooking so that it will be cooked with steam. The term pilâki is also used for fish cooked with various vegetables, including onion in the oven. In the Black Sea region, fish are usually fried with thick corn flour. Fish are also eaten cold; as smoked (isleme) or dried (çiroz), canned, salted or pickled (lâkerda). Fish is also cooked in salt or in dough in Turkey. Pazıda Levrek is a seafood speciality which consists of sea bass cooked in chard leaves. In fish restaurants, it is possible to find other fancy fish varieties like balık dolma (stuffed fish), balık iskender (inspired by İskender kebap), fishballs or fish en papillote. Fish soup prepared with vegetables, onion and flour is common in coastal towns and cities. In Istanbul's Eminönü and other coastal districts, grilled fish served in bread with tomatoes, herbs and onion is a popular fast food. In the inner parts of Turkey, trout alabalık is common as it is the main type of freshwater fish. Popular seafood mezes at coastlines include stuffed mussels, fried mussel and fried kalamar (squid) with tarator sauce.

Popular sea fish in Turkey include: 

 anchovy 
 sardine 
 bonito 
 gilt-head bream  or 
 red mullet 
 sea bass 
 whiting or 
 haddock 
 swordfish 
 Black Sea Turbot 
 red pandora 
 Jack mackerel 
 white grouper 
 bluefish

Desserts 

Cuisine in the late Ottoman Empire was heavily influenced by alafranga style food, in fashion all over Europe and in Russia in the late 19th century. In the Turkish context it has been regarded as a symbol of Westernization. This influence could still be seen in the earliest cookbooks of the early Republican period like the first edition of the Türk Kadınlar Tatlı Kitabı (Turkish Women's Book of Desserts) which had recipes for Western style sponge cake (pandispanya), mille feuille, petit beurre and other western  desserts. The revised edition published in 1966 devoted far more attention to traditional confectionery like şekerpare, baklava and helva. 

One of the world-renowned desserts of Turkish cuisine is baklava. Baklava is made either with pistachios or walnuts. Turkish cuisine has a range of baklava-like desserts which include .

Kadaif ('Kadayıf') is a common Turkish dessert that employs shredded yufka. There are different types of kadaif: tel (wire) or Burma (wring) kadayıf, both of which can be prepared with either walnuts or pistachios.

Although carrying the label "kadayıf", ekmek kadayıfı is totally different from "tel kadayıf". Künefe and ekmek kadayıfı are rich in syrup and butter, and are usually served with kaymak (clotted/scrambled butter). Künefe contains wire kadayıf with a layer of melted cheese in between and it is served hot with pistachios or walnuts.

Katmer is made as a dessert with kaymak (clotted cream,) and like many other delicacies from Gaziantep and Kilis , is also filled and topped with pistachios.

Among milk-based desserts, the most popular ones are muhallebi, su muhallebisi, sütlaç (rice pudding), keşkül, kazandibi (meaning the bottom of "kazan" because of its burnt surface), and tavuk göğsü (a sweet, gelatinous, milk pudding dessert quite similar to kazandibi, to which very thinly peeled chicken breast is added to give a chewy texture). A speciality from the Mediterranean region is haytalı, which consists of pieces of starch pudding and ice cream (or crushed ice) put in rose water sweetened with syrup.

Helva (halva): un helvası (flour helva is usually cooked after someone has died),süt helvası(its ingredients are raw cow's milk, butter, flour and sugar. it is cooked by frying the top in an oven at 250 °C.is popular in Bursa) irmik helvası (cooked with semolina and pine nuts),hoşmerim (cheese helva), yaz helvası (made from walnut or almond), tahin helvası (crushed sesame seeds. it is also eaten for breakfast), kos helva, pişmaniye (floss halva).

Other popular desserts include; Revani (with semolina and starch), şekerpare, kalburabasma, dilber dudağı, vezir parmağı, hanım göbeği, kemalpaşa, tulumba, zerde, paluze, irmik tatlısı/peltesi, lokma.

Güllaç is a dessert typically served at Ramadan, which consists of very thin, large dough layers put in milk and rose water, served with pomegranate seeds and walnuts. A story is told that in the kitchens of the Palace, those extra thin dough layers were prepared with "prayers", as it was believed that if one did not pray while opening phyllo dough, it would never be possible to obtain such thin layers.

Aşure can be described as a sweet soup containing boiled beans, wheat and dried fruits. Sometimes cinnamon and rose water is added when being served. According to legend, it was first cooked on Noah's Ark and contained seven different ingredients in one dish. All the Anatolian peoples have cooked and are still cooking aşure especially during the month of Muharrem.

Some traditional Turkish desserts are fruit-based: ayva tatlısı (quince), incir tatlısı (fig), kabak tatlısı (pumpkin), elma tatlısı (apple) and armut tatlısı (pear). Fruits are cooked in a pot or in an oven with sugar, carnations and cinnamon (without adding water). After being chilled, they are served with walnuts or pistachios and kaymak.

Homemade cookies/biscuits are commonly called kurabiye in Turkish. The most common types are acıbadem kurabiyesi (prepared only with eggs, sugar and almonds), un kurabiyesi (flour kurabiye) and cevizli kurabiye (kurabiye with walnuts). Another dough based dessert is ay çöreği.

Tahin-pekmez is a traditional combination especially in rural areas. Tahin is sesame paste and pekmez is grape syrup. These are sold separately and mixed before consumption.

Lokum (Turkish delight), which was eaten for digestion after meals and called "rahat hulkum" in the Ottoman era, is another well-known sweet/candy with a range of varieties.

Cezerye, cevizli sucuk (named after its sucuk/sujuk like shape, also known as Churchkhela in Circassian region) and pestil (fruit leather) are among other common sweets.

Marzipan badem ezmesi or fıstık ezmesi (made of ground pistachios) is another common confection in Turkey.

Another jelly like Turkish sweet is macun. Mesir macunu of Manisa/İzmir (which was also called "nevruziye" as this Macun was distributed on the first day of spring in the Ottoman Palace) contains 41 different spices. It is still believed that "mesir macunu" is good for health and has healing effects. As with lokum, nane macunu (prepared with mint) used to be eaten as a digestive after heavy meals. Herbs and flowers having curative effects were grown in the gardens of Topkapı under the control of the chief doctor "hekimbaşı" and pharmacists of the Palace who used those herbs for preparing special types of macun and sherbet.

There are also several types of ice creams based on salep powder or Cornstarch with Rose water such as Dondurma (Turkish gum ice cream), dried fruit ice cream, ice cream rose petals.

Dried fruit, used in dolma, pilav, meat dishes and other desserts is also eaten with almonds or walnuts as a dessert. Figs, grapes, apricots are the most widespread dried fruits.

Kaymak (clotted cream-butter) is often served with desserts to cut through their sweetness.

Turkish tea or Turkish coffee, with or without sugar, is usually served after dinner or more rarely together with desserts.

Street food 

 Dondurma
 iced almonds buzlu badem
 fried mussels, stuffed mussels midye
 fresh walnuts taze ceviz
 gözleme is a kind of food that a thin flat bread called "yufka" stuffed with potato, white or kaşar cheese, spinach, ground meat and/or other ingredients with or without spices and traditionally cooked over "sac", a traditional cooking equipment
 kokoreç
 fish bread balık ekmek
 sucuk ekmek
 köfte ekmek
 kumpir a baked potato served with kaşar cheese and many other toppings
 lokma
 roasted corn közde mısır
 roasted chesnuts kestane
 simit
 Macun

Beverages

Alcoholic beverages 

Although the majority of Turks profess the Islamic religion, alcoholic beverages are as widely available as anywhere. Rakı (pronounced [ɾaˈkɯ]) is the most popular alcoholic drink in Turkey.

There are a few local brands of lager such as Bomonti, Marmara 34 and Efes Pilsen and a small selection of international beers that are produced in Turkey such as Skol, Beck's, Miller, Foster's, Carlsberg and Tuborg. In Turkey, craft beers became popular in present-day; Gara Guzu, Feliz Kulpa, Pablo and Graf are some Turkish craft beer brands

There are a variety of local wines produced by Turkish brands such as Sevilen, Kavaklıdere, Doluca, Corvus, Kayra, Pamukkale and Diren which are getting more popular with the change of climatic conditions that affect the production of wine. A range of grape varieties are grown in Turkey. For the production of red wine, the following types of grapes are mainly used; in the Marmara Region, Pinot noir, Adakarası, Papazkarası, Semillion, Kuntra, Gamay, Cinsault; in the Aegean Region, Carignane, Çalkarası, Merlot, Cabernet Sauvignon, Alicante Bouschet; in the Black Sea Region and the eastern part of the country, Öküzgözü, Boğazkere; in Central Anatolia, Kalecik Karası, Papazkarası, Dimrit; in the Mediterranean Region, Sergi Karası, Dimrit. As for white wine, the grapes can be listed as follows; in the Marmara Region, Chardonnay, Riesling, Semillion, Beylerce, Yapıncak; in the Aegean Region, muscat and semillion; in the Black Sea Region, Narince; in Central Anatolia, Emir, Goat Cheese. In addition to mass production, it is quite popular to produce wines in private farms and sell them in the locality. Visitors can find different "home made" wines in Central Anatolia (Kapadokya/Cappadocia region - Nevşehir), the Aegean coast (Selçuk and Bozcaada (an island in the Aegean Sea)).

Non-alcoholic beverages 

At breakfast and all day long Turkish people drink black tea (çay). Tea is made with two teapots in Turkey. Strong bitter tea made in the upper pot is diluted by adding boiling water from the lower. Turkish coffee (kahve) is usually served after meals or with dessert.

Ayran (yogurt drink) is the most common cold beverage, which may accompany almost all dishes in Turkey, except those with fish and other seafood. It's a mix of yogurt and water, similar to lassi. It may be served with salt, according to taste.

Şalgam suyu (mild or spicy fermented black carrot juice) is another important non-alcoholic beverage that is usually combined with kebabs or served together with rakı.

Boza is a traditional winter drink, which is also known as millet wine (served cold with cinnamon and sometimes with leblebi).

Sahlep is another favorite in winter (served hot with cinnamon). Sahlep is extracted from the roots of wild orchids and may be used in Turkish ice cream as well. This was a popular drink in western Europe before coffee was brought from Africa and came to be widely known.

Limonata (lemonade) is very popular. It is traditionally served with baklava and other sweets. Sometimes lemonade is served with strawberry flavoring. This is called çilekli limonata.

Sherbet (Turkish şerbet, pronounced ) is a syrup which can be made from any of a wide variety of ingredients, especially fruits, flowers, or herbs. Examples include pears, quinces, strawberries, apples, cornelian cherry, pomegranates, oranges, rose petals, rose hips, or licorice and spices. Sherbet is drunk diluted with cold water.

In classical Turkish cuisine, hoşaf (from the Persian "Khosh-ab", meaning "fresh water") alternatively accompanies meat dishes and pilav (pilaf).

Related cuisines 

 Albanian cuisine
 Armenian cuisine
 Azerbaijani cuisine
 Balkan cuisine
 Caucasian cuisine
 Central Asian cuisine
 Cypriot cuisine
 Greek cuisine
 Iranian cuisine
 Levantine cuisine
 Mediterranean cuisine
 Mesopotamian cuisine
 Middle Eastern cuisine
 Mongolian cuisine
 Ottoman cuisine
 Turkmen cuisine

See also 

 Baklava
 Doner kebap
 İskender kebap
 Gözleme
 Kadaif
 Kumpir
 Mangal
 Mantı
 Meze
 Pide
 Turkish coffee
 Turkish rakı
 Turkish tea
 Turkish stuffed dishes

References

Bibliography 
 Budak, Süheyl, Antakya Mutfağı, Hatay 2008,  (1996 edition)
 Antakya-cuisine with Süheyl Budak and 75 ladies
 Gürsoy, Deniz, Turkish Cuisine in Historical Perspective, Istanbul, 2006, .
 Halıcı, Nevin, Konya Yemek Kültürü ve Konya Yemekleri, Istanbul 2005, .
 Halıcı, Nevin, Sufi Cuisine, Saqi 2005.
 Lambraki, Mirsini & Akın, Engin, Aynı Sofrada İki Ülke, Türk ve Yunan Mutfağı, Istanbul 2003, .
 Roden, Claudia, A New Book of Middle Eastern Food, 2000, .
 Şavkay, Turgut, Halk Mutfağımız Geleneksel Tatlarımızdan Seçmeler, Istanbul 2005, .
 Şavkay, Turgut, Turkish Cuisine, Istanbul 2003, 
 Ünsal, Artun & Süt, Uyuyunca, Türkiye Peynirleri, Istanbul, .
 Ünsal, Artun & Silivrim, Kaymak, Türkiye'nin Yoğurtları, Istanbul 2007, .
 Yerasimos, Marianna, Osmanlı Mutfağı, Istanbul 2002; published in English as 500 Years of Ottoman Cuisine.
 Zubaida, Sami & Tapper, Richard, A Taste of Thyme: Culinary Cultures of the Middle East, London and New York, 1994 and 2000, .

External links 

 Turkish Cultural Foundation - Turkish Cuisine Portal
 Cornucopia recipe index - Cookery Listing
 "Turkish Cousine" (Study In Turkey)

 
Mediterranean cuisine
Middle Eastern cuisine